No Strangers Here is a 1950 Australian dramatised documentary about a migrant family who move to Australia. Four actors play the migrants.

According to the Sun Herald:
Apart from acknowledgment of its good intentions, not very much can be said on behalf of this locally made narrative about a family of New Australians and their life in a country town. The script is deplorably slow in movement. The way is still wide open for a good Australian film- maker to search into the absorbing drama of human conflicts and hopes and doubts that is locked in the heart of every New Australian.

References

External links
Complete copy of film at NFSA Films

Australian documentary films